Grandmaster Ratte' (born Kevin Wheeler in April 1970 and formerly known as Swamp Rat and Swamp Ratte') is one of the founders of the Cult of the Dead Cow hacker group, along with Franken Gibe and Sid Vicious.  His official title in the cDc was "Imperial Wizard of ExXxtasy."

References

External links
Phrack magazine profile of Grandmaster Ratte'
Damage, Inc. magazine interview

1970 births
Living people
American bloggers
People from Lubbock, Texas
Lubbock High School alumni
Cult of the Dead Cow members
Texas Tech University alumni